Michael Barr may refer to:

 Michael Barr (mathematician) (born 1937), Canadian mathematician
 Michael Barr (software engineer), American software engineer
 Michael Preston Barr (1927–2009), American pop music composer
 Michael Barr (Treasury official), American professor
 Michael Barr (died 2016), Irish murder victim
Michael Barr, vocalist of metalcore band Volumes

See also
 Mike Barr (disambiguation)
 Mick Barr, American guitarist